The Forgotten Frontier is a 1931 American documentary film about the Frontier Nursing Service, nurses on horseback, who traveled the back roads of the Appalachian Mountains of eastern Kentucky. It was directed by Mary Marvin Breckinridge, and featured her cousin, Mary Breckinridge, who was a nurse-midwife and founded the Frontier Nursing Service. Also featured are the people of Leslie County, Kentucky, many of whom reenacted their stories.

The film was shot with a hand-cranked camera, often in extreme climate. Stills created during the film's production are available at the Library of Congress.

A soundtrack was added in the 1990s by the Library of Congress.

In 1996, this film has been selected for preservation in the United States National Film Registry as being deemed  "culturally, historically, or aesthetically significant films".

Footage from the film was used in the 1984 documentary Frontier Nursing Service.

References

External links
 
 The Forgotten Frontier on the United States National Library of Medicine
 The Forgotten Frontier essay by Daniel Eagan in America's Film Legacy: The Authoritative Guide to the Landmark Movies in the National Film Registry, A&C Black, 2010 , pages 178-179 
 The Forgotten Frontier can be seen on the National Screening Room of the Library of Congress 
 

1931 films
United States National Film Registry films
Black-and-white documentary films
American documentary films
Sponsored films
Documentary films about United States history
Documentary films about pregnancy
1931 documentary films
Works about midwifery
Nursing in the United States
Documentary films about Appalachia
1930s pregnancy films
American black-and-white films
American pregnancy films
History of women in Kentucky
1930s English-language films
1930s American films